This is a list of Estonian television related events from 1978.

Events

Debuts
19 October - television series "Ajurünnak" started. The series was hosted by Rein Järlik and Hagi Šein.

Television shows

Ending this year

Births

Deaths

See also
 1978 in Estonia

References

1970s in Estonian television